The 1969 VFL season was the 73rd season of the Victorian Football League (VFL), the highest level senior Australian rules football competition in Victoria. The season featured twelve clubs, ran from 5 April until 27 September, and comprised a 20-game home-and-away season followed by a finals series featuring the top four clubs.

The premiership was won by the Richmond Football Club for the seventh time, after it defeated  by 25 points in the 1969 VFL Grand Final.

Premiership season
In 1969, the VFL competition consisted of twelve teams of 18 on-the-field players each, plus two substitute players, known as the 19th man and the 20th man. A player could be substituted for any reason; however, once substituted, a player could not return to the field of play under any circumstances.

Teams played each other in a home-and-away season of 20 rounds; rounds 12 to 20 were the "home-and-away reverse" of rounds 1 to 9.

Once the 20 round home-and-away season had finished, the 1969 VFL Premiers were determined by the specific format and conventions of the Page–McIntyre system.

Round 1

|- bgcolor="#CCCCFF"
| Home team
| Home team score
| Away team
| Away team score
| Venue
| Crowd
| Date
|- bgcolor="#FFFFFF"
| 
| 15.20 (110)
| 
| 14.17 (101)
| Arden Street Oval
| 14,046
| 5 April 1969
|- bgcolor="#FFFFFF"
| 
| 17.9 (111)
| 
| 11.23 (89)
| Glenferrie Oval
| 28,104
| 5 April 1969
|- bgcolor="#FFFFFF"
| 
| 11.13 (79)
| 
| 11.16 (82)
| Moorabbin Oval
| 37,767
| 5 April 1969
|- bgcolor="#FFFFFF"
| 
| 17.16 (118)
| 
| 13.13 (91)
| Kardinia Park
| 23,501
| 7 April 1969
|- bgcolor="#FFFFFF"
| 
| 15.13 (103)
| 
| 23.21 (159)
| Princes Park
| 20,210
| 7 April 1969
|- bgcolor="#FFFFFF"
| 
| 15.21 (111)
| 
| 12.10 (82)
| MCG
| 62,152
| 7 April 1969

Round 2

|- bgcolor="#CCCCFF"
| Home team
| Home team score
| Away team
| Away team score
| Venue
| Crowd
| Date
|- bgcolor="#FFFFFF"
| 
| 12.7 (79)
| 
| 15.17 (107)
| MCG
| 16,379
| 12 April 1969
|- bgcolor="#FFFFFF"
| 
| 9.11 (65)
| 
| 14.14 (98)
| Western Oval
| 21,352
| 12 April 1969
|- bgcolor="#FFFFFF"
| 
| 13.13 (91)
| 
| 14.7 (91)
| Windy Hill
| 18,400
| 12 April 1969
|- bgcolor="#FFFFFF"
| 
| 11.16 (82)
| 
| 14.15 (99)
| Victoria Park
| 27,353
| 12 April 1969
|- bgcolor="#FFFFFF"
| 
| 30.30 (210)
| 
| 12.10 (82)
| Princes Park
| 26,400
| 12 April 1969
|- bgcolor="#FFFFFF"
| 
| 14.14 (98)
| 
| 15.10 (100)
| Lake Oval
| 12,464
| 12 April 1969

Round 3

|- bgcolor="#CCCCFF"
| Home team
| Home team score
| Away team
| Away team score
| Venue
| Crowd
| Date
|- bgcolor="#FFFFFF"
| 
| 19.20 (134)
| 
| 11.8 (74)
| Kardinia Park
| 15,068
| 19 April 1969
|- bgcolor="#FFFFFF"
| 
| 14.7 (91)
| 
| 19.18 (132)
| Princes Park
| 12,240
| 19 April 1969
|- bgcolor="#FFFFFF"
| 
| 12.13 (85)
| 
| 14.14 (98)
| Windy Hill
| 15,800
| 19 April 1969
|- bgcolor="#FFFFFF"
| 
| 19.16 (130)
| 
| 9.8 (62)
| Victoria Park
| 18,729
| 19 April 1969
|- bgcolor="#FFFFFF"
| 
| 13.28 (106)
| 
| 16.15 (111)
| MCG
| 26,884
| 19 April 1969
|- bgcolor="#FFFFFF"
| 
| 7.10 (52)
| 
| 11.15 (81)
| Western Oval
| 20,250
| 19 April 1969

Round 4

|- bgcolor="#CCCCFF"
| Home team
| Home team score
| Away team
| Away team score
| Venue
| Crowd
| Date
|- bgcolor="#FFFFFF"
| 
| 9.15 (69)
| 
| 13.14 (92)
| Moorabbin Oval
| 42,954
| 25 April 1969
|- bgcolor="#FFFFFF"
| 
| 10.19 (79)
| 
| 13.19 (97)
| MCG
| 38,358
| 25 April 1969
|- bgcolor="#FFFFFF"
| 
| 13.11 (89)
| 
| 23.15 (153)
| Princes Park
| 39,120
| 26 April 1969
|- bgcolor="#FFFFFF"
| 
| 13.13 (91)
| 
| 19.22 (136)
| Lake Oval
| 16,663
| 26 April 1969
|- bgcolor="#FFFFFF"
| 
| 19.16 (130)
| 
| 12.13 (85)
| Glenferrie Oval
| 15,589
| 26 April 1969
|- bgcolor="#FFFFFF"
| 
| 19.15 (129)
| 
| 13.18 (96)
| Arden Street Oval
| 13,224
| 26 April 1969

Round 5

|- bgcolor="#CCCCFF"
| Home team
| Home team score
| Away team
| Away team score
| Venue
| Crowd
| Date
|- bgcolor="#FFFFFF"
| 
| 21.10 (136)
| 
| 14.20 (104)
| Glenferrie Oval
| 13,186
| 3 May 1969
|- bgcolor="#FFFFFF"
| 
| 11.18 (84)
| 
| 22.12 (144)
| Western Oval
| 17,522
| 3 May 1969
|- bgcolor="#FFFFFF"
| 
| 16.17 (113)
| 
| 12.11 (83)
| Windy Hill
| 23,000
| 3 May 1969
|- bgcolor="#FFFFFF"
| 
| 20.17 (137)
| 
| 17.10 (112)
| Princes Park
| 19,041
| 3 May 1969
|- bgcolor="#FFFFFF"
| 
| 18.12 (120)
| 
| 6.19 (55)
| MCG
| 22,991
| 3 May 1969
|- bgcolor="#FFFFFF"
| 
| 18.12 (120)
| 
| 16.18 (114)
| Moorabbin Oval
| 34,959
| 3 May 1969

Round 6

|- bgcolor="#CCCCFF"
| Home team
| Home team score
| Away team
| Away team score
| Venue
| Crowd
| Date
|- bgcolor="#FFFFFF"
| 
| 13.15 (93)
| 
| 16.25 (121)
| MCG
| 26,848
| 10 May 1969
|- bgcolor="#FFFFFF"
| 
| 17.13 (115)
| 
| 8.14 (62)
| Victoria Park
| 19,025
| 10 May 1969
|- bgcolor="#FFFFFF"
| 
| 14.9 (93)
| 
| 7.14 (56)
| Lake Oval
| 17,536
| 10 May 1969
|- bgcolor="#FFFFFF"
| 
| 13.9 (87)
| 
| 14.12 (96)
| Arden Street Oval
| 15,338
| 10 May 1969
|- bgcolor="#FFFFFF"
| 
| 13.12 (90)
| 
| 17.13 (115)
| Princes Park
| 13,028
| 10 May 1969
|- bgcolor="#FFFFFF"
| 
| 18.16 (124)
| 
| 13.7 (85)
| Kardinia Park
| 32,025
| 10 May 1969

Round 7

|- bgcolor="#CCCCFF"
| Home team
| Home team score
| Away team
| Away team score
| Venue
| Crowd
| Date
|- bgcolor="#FFFFFF"
| 
| 14.15 (99)
| 
| 14.23 (107)
| Kardinia Park
| 17,102
| 17 May 1969
|- bgcolor="#FFFFFF"
| 
| 8.10 (58)
| 
| 9.12 (66)
| Western Oval
| 11,462
| 17 May 1969
|- bgcolor="#FFFFFF"
| 
| 13.20 (98)
| 
| 13.7 (85)
| Victoria Park
| 14,614
| 17 May 1969
|- bgcolor="#FFFFFF"
| 
| 14.24 (108)
| 
| 12.6 (78)
| Princes Park
| 14,973
| 17 May 1969
|- bgcolor="#FFFFFF"
| 
| 7.10 (52)
| 
| 8.13 (61)
| MCG
| 35,933
| 17 May 1969
|- bgcolor="#FFFFFF"
| 
| 16.10 (106)
| 
| 11.14 (80)
| Moorabbin Oval
| 19,008
| 17 May 1969

Round 8

|- bgcolor="#CCCCFF"
| Home team
| Home team score
| Away team
| Away team score
| Venue
| Crowd
| Date
|- bgcolor="#FFFFFF"
| 
| 15.13 (103)
| 
| 13.16 (94)
| Arden Street Oval
| 16,602
| 24 May 1969
|- bgcolor="#FFFFFF"
| 
| 12.9 (81)
| 
| 15.12 (102)
| Princes Park
| 9,086
| 24 May 1969
|- bgcolor="#FFFFFF"
| 
| 15.15 (105)
| 
| 13.12 (90)
| Windy Hill
| 15,400
| 24 May 1969
|- bgcolor="#FFFFFF"
| 
| 13.16 (94)
| 
| 13.12 (90)
| Glenferrie Oval
| 21,788
| 24 May 1969
|- bgcolor="#FFFFFF"
| 
| 11.8 (74)
| 
| 18.22 (130)
| Lake Oval
| 21,142
| 24 May 1969
|- bgcolor="#FFFFFF"
| 
| 12.14 (86)
| 
| 17.13 (115)
| MCG
| 48,656
| 24 May 1969

Round 9

|- bgcolor="#CCCCFF"
| Home team
| Home team score
| Away team
| Away team score
| Venue
| Crowd
| Date
|- bgcolor="#FFFFFF"
| 
| 9.15 (69)
| 
| 14.10 (94)
| MCG
| 13,765
| 31 May 1969
|- bgcolor="#FFFFFF"
| 
| 8.13 (61)
| 
| 7.8 (50)
| Western Oval
| 8,529
| 31 May 1969
|- bgcolor="#FFFFFF"
| 
| 17.16 (118)
| 
| 9.4 (58)
| Victoria Park
| 21,154
| 31 May 1969
|- bgcolor="#FFFFFF"
| 
| 15.13 (103)
| 
| 6.9 (45)
| Princes Park
| 16,930
| 31 May 1969
|- bgcolor="#FFFFFF"
| 
| 14.11 (95)
| 
| 7.7 (49)
| Moorabbin Oval
| 15,186
| 31 May 1969
|- bgcolor="#FFFFFF"
| 
| 15.17 (107)
| 
| 6.9 (45)
| Kardinia Park
| 8,923
| 31 May 1969

Round 10

|- bgcolor="#CCCCFF"
| Home team
| Home team score
| Away team
| Away team score
| Venue
| Crowd
| Date
|- bgcolor="#FFFFFF"
| 
| 14.10 (94)
| 
| 11.14 (80)
| MCG
| 44,710
| 7 June 1969
|- bgcolor="#FFFFFF"
| 
| 12.9 (81)
| 
| 16.9 (105)
| Princes Park
| 10,170
| 7 June 1969
|- bgcolor="#FFFFFF"
| 
| 14.22 (106)
| 
| 8.11 (59)
| Victoria Park
| 38,436
| 14 June 1969
|- bgcolor="#FFFFFF"
| 
| 15.13 (103)
| 
| 18.15 (123)
| Lake Oval
| 18,453
| 14 June 1969
|- bgcolor="#FFFFFF"
| 
| 17.18 (120)
| 
| 12.23 (95)
| MCG
| 27,330
| 16 June 1969
|- bgcolor="#FFFFFF"
| 
| 7.15 (57)
| 
| 10.18 (78)
| Arden Street Oval
| 26,914
| 16 June 1969

Round 11

|- bgcolor="#CCCCFF"
| Home team
| Home team score
| Away team
| Away team score
| Venue
| Crowd
| Date
|- bgcolor="#FFFFFF"
| 
| 25.13 (163)
| 
| 14.21 (105)
| Glenferrie Oval
| 13,369
| 21 June 1969
|- bgcolor="#FFFFFF"
| 
| 17.11 (113)
| 
| 12.14 (86)
| Kardinia Park
| 24,278
| 21 June 1969
|- bgcolor="#FFFFFF"
| 
| 20.23 (143)
| 
| 15.7 (97)
| Western Oval
| 12,893
| 21 June 1969
|- bgcolor="#FFFFFF"
| 
| 24.14 (158)
| 
| 14.14 (98)
| Princes Park
| 16,260
| 21 June 1969
|- bgcolor="#FFFFFF"
| 
| 17.18 (120)
| 
| 13.16 (94)
| Moorabbin Oval
| 19,491
| 21 June 1969
|- bgcolor="#FFFFFF"
| 
| 13.19 (97)
| 
| 16.12 (108)
| Windy Hill
| 28,850
| 21 June 1969

Round 12

|- bgcolor="#CCCCFF"
| Home team
| Home team score
| Away team
| Away team score
| Venue
| Crowd
| Date
|- bgcolor="#FFFFFF"
| 
| 8.15 (63)
| 
| 7.12 (54)
| Windy Hill
| 16,957
| 28 June 1969
|- bgcolor="#FFFFFF"
| 
| 9.24 (78)
| 
| 6.11 (47)
| Victoria Park
| 31,923
| 28 June 1969
|- bgcolor="#FFFFFF"
| 
| 9.12 (66)
| 
| 7.12 (54)
| Princes Park
| 22,154
| 28 June 1969
|- bgcolor="#FFFFFF"
| 
| 12.11 (83)
| 
| 11.14 (80)
| Lake Oval
| 9,461
| 28 June 1969
|- bgcolor="#FFFFFF"
| 
| 11.12 (78)
| 
| 15.9 (99)
| MCG
| 23,557
| 28 June 1969
|- bgcolor="#FFFFFF"
| 
| 17.13 (115)
| 
| 10.8 (68)
| Western Oval
| 11,603
| 28 June 1969

Round 13

|- bgcolor="#CCCCFF"
| Home team
| Home team score
| Away team
| Away team score
| Venue
| Crowd
| Date
|- bgcolor="#FFFFFF"
| 
| 18.21 (129)
| 
| 11.14 (80)
| Princes Park
| 7,540
| 5 July 1969
|- bgcolor="#FFFFFF"
| 
| 19.16 (130)
| 
| 19.13 (127)
| Arden Street Oval
| 6,470
| 5 July 1969
|- bgcolor="#FFFFFF"
| 
| 12.15 (87)
| 
| 12.5 (77)
| Moorabbin Oval
| 14,995
| 5 July 1969
|- bgcolor="#FFFFFF"
| 
| 10.14 (74)
| 
| 13.16 (94)
| Kardinia Park
| 20,247
| 5 July 1969
|- bgcolor="#FFFFFF"
| 
| 13.15 (93)
| 
| 12.19 (91)
| MCG
| 45,546
| 5 July 1969
|- bgcolor="#FFFFFF"
| 
| 11.14 (80)
| 
| 22.17 (149)
| Glenferrie Oval
| 18,848
| 5 July 1969

Round 14

|- bgcolor="#CCCCFF"
| Home team
| Home team score
| Away team
| Away team score
| Venue
| Crowd
| Date
|- bgcolor="#FFFFFF"
| 
| 6.12 (48)
| 
| 17.15 (117)
| Arden Street Oval
| 10,597
| 12 July 1969
|- bgcolor="#FFFFFF"
| 
| 17.12 (114)
| 
| 16.16 (112)
| Princes Park
| 15,078
| 12 July 1969
|- bgcolor="#FFFFFF"
| 
| 12.15 (87)
| 
| 17.11 (113)
| Lake Oval
| 9,598
| 12 July 1969
|- bgcolor="#FFFFFF"
| 
| 9.4 (58)
| 
| 11.8 (74)
| Moorabbin Oval
| 11,874
| 12 July 1969
|- bgcolor="#FFFFFF"
| 
| 17.19 (121)
| 
| 16.18 (114)
| Glenferrie Oval
| 17,605
| 12 July 1969
|- bgcolor="#FFFFFF"
| 
| 16.11 (107)
| 
| 15.19 (109)
| MCG
| 32,485
| 12 July 1969

Round 15

|- bgcolor="#CCCCFF"
| Home team
| Home team score
| Away team
| Away team score
| Venue
| Crowd
| Date
|- bgcolor="#FFFFFF"
| 
| 22.12 (144)
| 
| 11.11 (77)
| MCG
| 21,959
| 19 July 1969
|- bgcolor="#FFFFFF"
| 
| 13.14 (92)
| 
| 16.8 (104)
| Kardinia Park
| 19,522
| 19 July 1969
|- bgcolor="#FFFFFF"
| 
| 15.16 (106)
| 
| 14.9 (93)
| Western Oval
| 15,955
| 19 July 1969
|- bgcolor="#FFFFFF"
| 
| 20.6 (126)
| 
| 14.12 (96)
| Princes Park
| 9,670
| 19 July 1969
|- bgcolor="#FFFFFF"
| 
| 13.21 (99)
| 
| 13.16 (94)
| Windy Hill
| 15,012
| 19 July 1969
|- bgcolor="#FFFFFF"
| 
| 15.16 (106)
| 
| 17.14 (116)
| Victoria Park
| 43,610
| 19 July 1969

Round 16

|- bgcolor="#CCCCFF"
| Home team
| Home team score
| Away team
| Away team score
| Venue
| Crowd
| Date
|- bgcolor="#FFFFFF"
| 
| 13.17 (95)
| 
| 21.5 (131)
| MCG
| 32,527
| 26 July 1969
|- bgcolor="#FFFFFF"
| 
| 13.16 (94)
| 
| 9.13 (67)
| Arden Street Oval
| 14,103
| 26 July 1969
|- bgcolor="#FFFFFF"
| 
| 11.8 (74)
| 
| 19.12 (126)
| Lake Oval
| 15,151
| 26 July 1969
|- bgcolor="#FFFFFF"
| 
| 9.12 (66)
| 
| 8.9 (57)
| Princes Park
| 16,211
| 2 August 1969
|- bgcolor="#FFFFFF"
| 
| 12.11 (83)
| 
| 10.13 (73)
| Victoria Park
| 29,759
| 2 August 1969
|- bgcolor="#FFFFFF"
| 
| 23.17 (155)
| 
| 11.12 (78)
| Kardinia Park
| 21,025
| 2 August 1969

Round 17

|- bgcolor="#CCCCFF"
| Home team
| Home team score
| Away team
| Away team score
| Venue
| Crowd
| Date
|- bgcolor="#FFFFFF"
| 
| 9.14 (68)
| 
| 15.10 (100)
| Moorabbin Oval
| 13,400
| 9 August 1969
|- bgcolor="#FFFFFF"
| 
| 22.12 (144)
| 
| 18.18 (126)
| Glenferrie Oval
| 13,504
| 9 August 1969
|- bgcolor="#FFFFFF"
| 
| 19.18 (132)
| 
| 14.11 (95)
| Windy Hill
| 15,548
| 9 August 1969
|- bgcolor="#FFFFFF"
| 
| 14.11 (95)
| 
| 17.8 (110)
| Princes Park
| 27,166
| 9 August 1969
|- bgcolor="#FFFFFF"
| 
| 19.11 (125)
| 
| 12.13 (85)
| MCG
| 23,519
| 9 August 1969
|- bgcolor="#FFFFFF"
| 
| 11.16 (82)
| 
| 16.8 (104)
| Western Oval
| 21,201
| 9 August 1969

Round 18

|- bgcolor="#CCCCFF"
| Home team
| Home team score
| Away team
| Away team score
| Venue
| Crowd
| Date
|- bgcolor="#FFFFFF"
| 
| 13.10 (88)
| 
| 13.21 (99)
| Glenferrie Oval
| 19,480
| 16 August 1969
|- bgcolor="#FFFFFF"
| 
| 19.25 (139)
| 
| 11.10 (76)
| Windy Hill
| 15,246
| 16 August 1969
|- bgcolor="#FFFFFF"
| 
| 13.11 (89)
| 
| 14.14 (98)
| Arden Street Oval
| 12,836
| 16 August 1969
|- bgcolor="#FFFFFF"
| 
| 16.17 (113)
| 
| 13.18 (96)
| Lake Oval
| 11,250
| 16 August 1969
|- bgcolor="#FFFFFF"
| 
| 9.16 (70)
| 
| 12.18 (90)
| Princes Park
| 17,890
| 16 August 1969
|- bgcolor="#FFFFFF"
| 
| 14.15 (99)
| 
| 13.14 (92)
| MCG
| 27,209
| 16 August 1969

Round 19

|- bgcolor="#CCCCFF"
| Home team
| Home team score
| Away team
| Away team score
| Venue
| Crowd
| Date
|- bgcolor="#FFFFFF"
| 
| 16.14 (110)
| 
| 14.11 (95)
| Kardinia Park
| 31,569
| 23 August 1969
|- bgcolor="#FFFFFF"
| 
| 19.15 (129)
| 
| 6.22 (58)
| Victoria Park
| 19,428
| 23 August 1969
|- bgcolor="#FFFFFF"
| 
| 20.7 (127)
| 
| 24.12 (156)
| Princes Park
| 27,657
| 23 August 1969
|- bgcolor="#FFFFFF"
| 
| 21.18 (144)
| 
| 8.10 (58)
| Moorabbin Oval
| 11,109
| 23 August 1969
|- bgcolor="#FFFFFF"
| 
| 14.13 (97)
| 
| 14.15 (99)
| MCG
| 17,790
| 23 August 1969
|- bgcolor="#FFFFFF"
| 
| 14.10 (94)
| 
| 12.10 (82)
| Western Oval
| 16,043
| 23 August 1969

Round 20

|- bgcolor="#CCCCFF"
| Home team
| Home team score
| Away team
| Away team score
| Venue
| Crowd
| Date
|- bgcolor="#FFFFFF"
| 
| 14.17 (101)
| 
| 13.12 (90)
| Glenferrie Oval
| 13,539
| 30 August 1969
|- bgcolor="#FFFFFF"
| 
| 13.15 (93)
| 
| 9.16 (70)
| Princes Park
| 12,990
| 30 August 1969
|- bgcolor="#FFFFFF"
| 
| 17.18 (120)
| 
| 13.7 (85)
| Lake Oval
| 10,038
| 30 August 1969
|- bgcolor="#FFFFFF"
| 
| 23.16 (154)
| 
| 9.10 (64)
| MCG
| 33,591
| 30 August 1969
|- bgcolor="#FFFFFF"
| 
| 13.11 (89)
| 
| 14.12 (96)
| Arden Street Oval
| 17,504
| 30 August 1969
|- bgcolor="#FFFFFF"
| 
| 17.16 (118)
| 
| 20.9 (129)
| Windy Hill
| 24,456
| 30 August 1969

Ladder

Consolation Night Series Competition
The consolation night series were held under the floodlights at Lake Oval, South Melbourne, for the teams (5th to 12th on ladder) out of the finals at the end of the home and away rounds.

Final: Hawthorn 10.17 (77) defeated Melbourne 9.18 (72).

Premiership Finals

First Semi-Final

Second Semi-Final

Preliminary Final

Grand final

Awards
 The 1969 VFL Premiership team was Richmond.
 The VFL's leading goalkicker was Doug Wade of Geelong who kicked 127 goals (including 5 goals in the final series).
 The winner of the 1969 Brownlow Medal was Kevin Murray of Fitzroy with 19 votes.
 Melbourne took the "wooden spoon" in 1969.
Melbourne 12.16 (88) defeated  8.12 (60) in the Grand Final, held as a curtain-raiser to the seniors Grand Final at the Melbourne Cricket Ground on 27 September.

Notable events
 In December 1968, with VFL Park under construction, the VFL announced that the 1970 VFL season would be extended to 21 or 22 rounds, with each of the 12 clubs to play three games at VFL Park. In all, 18 premiership matches would be played at Waverley that season. The idea was that if a 21-round season had been decided, each club would play nine home games, nine away games and three games at VFL park. If a 22-round season was agreed upon, six clubs would play ten games on their home grounds, and the other six would play nine home ground matches. In 1971, the home ground advantage would be reversed, so that those teams that had nine home ground games in 1970 would play ten home ground games in 1971 and vice versa for the other six teams.
 The VFL introduced a rule awarding a free kick against a player if he kicked the ball out of bounds on the full. The rule is considered to be a major contributor to an increase in scoring, and an increased prominence of full forwards, by forcing teams to play more direct football – a trend which had also seen under the out-of-bounds rules which were in place during the 1930s. Three full-forwards kicked large hauls of goals in 1969: Doug Wade of Geelong with 127 goals, Peter Hudson of Hawthorn with 120 goals (including 16.1 in Round 5), and Peter McKenna of Collingwood with 98 goals (including 16.4 in Round 19). The VFL was reprimanded for introducing the rule change without the approval of the Australian National Football Council, but there was no further penalty and the rule was soon agreed to at ANFC level.
Prior to the season, Geoff Bryant of Victorian Football Association club Box Hill was cleared to the North Melbourne Football Club. Under a rule that the VFA had introduced in 1967, a transfer fee of $2,000 was set for Bryant's clearance; but, under the Coulter Laws, VFL clubs were forbidden from paying any sort of transfer fee. The VFA formally approved Bryant's clearance, and it initially appeared that it had done so without the transfer fee being paid; but VFA secretary Fred Hill then reported to the press that North Melbourne had indeed secretly paid the transfer fee in defiance of the VFL's rules – and, in fact, Box Hill president Reg Shineberg claimed to have received the fee in cash, under cover of darkness, from a man he did not know. North Melbourne was required to face the VFL arbitrators over the allegations, but charges against the club were dropped when the VFA did not provide any written corroborating evidence. Whether or not the illegal transfer fee was actually paid was never proven.
 In Round 2, Carlton set the record for highest score in a game, scoring 30.30 (210) against Hawthorn. This beat Richmond's 38-year-old record, set in the 1931 VFL season, by eleven points. This Carlton record stood for another 9 years, remained unbeaten until the 1978 VFL season.
 The lowest score of the season was a record high 6.9 (45). The previous record high lowest score was 42 points in 1943.
 In Round 4, Carlton and Collingwood played a tough, spiteful, and vicious match with many brawls at Princes Park. "Percy" Jones of Carlton was reported for striking both Terry Waters and "Jerker" Jenkin of Collingwood during the first quarter; Carlton's Ricky McLean was reported for striking Collingwood's Len Thompson during the first quarter and for striking Collingwood's Brian McKenzie during the last quarter; Ted Potter was reported for striking Carlton's John Nicholls during the last quarter (Nicholls had to leave the field with an eye injury); Len Thompson was reported for striking Carlton's Vin Waite (Carlton's 19th man, who substituted for the injured Nicholls) during the last quarter. Whilst the field umpire (Ray Sleeth) was writing out the match reports he had an extended, heated clash with Carlton president George Harris; the reason for this extended clash was later evident when all of the charges against all of the players were dismissed on a technicality: the umpires had taken too long to inform the club officials of the charges after the final siren had sounded.
 In Round 8, Michael Patterson was hit in the face with a football by Carlton trainer, Ron Vincent. The event was immortalised in Mike Brady's football anthem "Up There Cazaly".
 On 27 July 1969, Ted Whitten turned 36. The Round 16 Footscray team of twenty contained ten players who had not even been born when Whitten played his first game for Footscray in 1951.
 In the First Semi-Final Richmond thrashed Geelong by a VFL semi-final record margin, 25.17 (167) to 7.7 (49) in front of a record crowd of 101,233 spectators.
 In the 1969 Grand Final, Ian Owen's Richmond guernsey carried the number 52. There is no record of any Grand Final player carrying a larger number. (Owen played the entire match with a depressed fracture of the cheekbone that he had sustained in the Preliminary Final against Collingwood a week earlier.)

See also
 List of VFL debuts in 1969

References

Bibliography
 Hogan, P., The Tigers of Old, The Richmond Football Club, (Richmond), 1996. 
 Maplestone, M., Flying Higher: History of the Essendon Football Club 1872–1996, Essendon Football Club, (Melbourne), 1996. 
 Rogers, S. & Brown, A., Every Game Ever Played: VFL/AFL Results 1897–1997 (Sixth Edition), Viking Books, (Ringwood), 1998. 
 Ross, J. (ed), 100 Years of Australian Football 1897–1996: The Complete Story of the AFL, All the Big Stories, All the Great Pictures, All the Champions, Every AFL Season Reported, Viking, (Ringwood), 1996.

External links
 1969 Season – AFL Tables
 Blueseum: Match Report: Round 4, 1969

Australian Football League seasons
VFL season